Cloves are the aromatic flower buds of a tree in the family Myrtaceae, Syzygium aromaticum. They are native to the Maluku Islands (or Moluccas) in Indonesia, and are commonly used as a spice, flavoring or fragrance in consumer products, such as toothpaste, soaps, or cosmetics. Cloves are available throughout the year owing to different harvest seasons across various countries.

Etymology 
The word clove, first used in English in the 15th century, derives via Middle English , Anglo-French clowes de gilofre and Old French , from the Latin word  "nail". The related English word gillyflower, originally meaning "clove", derives via said Old French  and Latin , from the Greek  "clove", literally "nut leaf".

Description
The flower buds initially have a pale hue, gradually turn green, then transition to a bright red when ready for harvest.

Clove stalks are slender stems of the inflorescence axis that show opposite decussate branching. Externally, they are brownish, rough, and irregularly wrinkled longitudinally with short fracture and dry, woody texture. Mother cloves (anthophylli) are the ripe fruits of cloves that are ovoid, brown berries, unilocular and one-seeded. 
Blown cloves are expanded flowers from which both corollae and stamens have been detached. Exhausted cloves have most or all the oil removed by distillation. They yield no oil and are darker in color.

Uses 

Cloves are used in the cuisine of Asian, African, Mediterranean, and the Near and Middle East countries, lending flavor to meats (such as baked ham), curries, and marinades, as well as fruit (such as apples, pears, and rhubarb). Cloves may be used to give aromatic and flavor qualities to hot beverages, often combined with other ingredients such as lemon and sugar. They are a common element in spice blends, including pumpkin pie spice and speculaas spices.

In Mexican cuisine, cloves are best known as clavos de olor, and often accompany cumin and cinnamon. They are also used in Peruvian cuisine, in a wide variety of dishes such as carapulcra and arroz con leche.

A major component of clove taste is imparted by the chemical eugenol, and the quantity of the spice required is typically small. It pairs well with cinnamon, allspice, vanilla, red wine, basil, onion, citrus peel, star anise, and peppercorns.

Non-culinary uses 
The spice is used in a type of cigarette called kretek in Indonesia. Clove cigarettes were smoked throughout Europe, Asia, and the United States. Clove cigarettes are currently classified in the United States as cigars, the result of a ban of flavored cigarettes in September 2009.

Clove essential oil may be used to inhibit mold growth on various types of foods. In addition to these non-culinary uses of clove, it can be used to protect wood in a system for cultural heritage conservation, and showed the efficacy of clove essential oil to be higher than a boron-based wood preservative. Cloves can be used to make a fragrant pomander when combined with an orange. When given as a gift in Victorian England, such a pomander indicated warmth of feeling.

Potential medicinal uses and adverse effects 
Use of clove for any medicinal purpose has not been approved by the US Food and Drug Administration, and its use may cause adverse effects if taken orally by people with liver disease, blood clotting and immune system disorders, or food allergies.

Cloves are used in traditional medicine as the essential oil, which is used as an anodyne (analgesic) mainly for dental emergencies and other disorders. There is evidence that clove oil containing eugenol is effective for toothache pain and other types of pain, and one review reported efficacy of eugenol combined with zinc oxide as an analgesic for alveolar osteitis. Clove essential oil may prevent the growth of Enterococcus faecalis bacteria which is often present in a root canal treatment failure.

Studies to determine its effectiveness for fever reduction, as a mosquito repellent, and to prevent premature ejaculation have been inconclusive. It remains unproven whether blood sugar levels are reduced by cloves or clove oil. The essential oil may be used in aromatherapy.

History 

Until the colonial era, cloves only grew on a few islands in the Moluccas (historically called the Spice Islands), including Bacan, Makian, Moti, Ternate, and Tidore. One clove tree named Afo that experts believe is the oldest in the world on Ternate may be 350–400 years old.

Cloves were first traded by the Austronesian peoples in the Austronesian maritime trade network (which began at around 1500 BC, later becoming the Maritime Silk Road and part of the Spice Trade). The first notable example of modern clove farming developed on the east coast of Madagascar, and is cultivated in three separate ways, a monoculture, agricultural parklands, and agroforestry systems.

Archaeologist Giorgio Buccellati found cloves in Terqa, Syria, in a burned-down house which was dated to 1720 BC. This was the first evidence of cloves being used in the west before Roman times. The discovery was first reported in 1978. They reached Rome by the first century AD.

Another archeological find of a clove is represented by two examples found at a trading port in Sri Lanka, dated to around 900–1100 AD. From Chinese records during the Song Dynasty (960 to 1279 AD), cloves were primarily exported from the Moluccas by ships originating from the Austronesian polities of Java, Srivijaya, Champa, and Butuan.

Cloves were also present in records in China, Sri Lanka, Southern India, Persia, and Oman by around the third century to second century BC. These mentions of "cloves" reported in China, South Asia, and the Middle East come from before the establishment of Southeast Asian maritime trade. But all of these are misidentifications that referred to other plants (like cassia buds, cinnamon, or nutmeg); or are imports from Maritime Southeast Asia mistakenly identified as being natively produced in these regions.

During the colonial era, cloves were traded like oil, with an enforced limit on exportation. As the Dutch East India Company consolidated its control of the spice trade in the 17th century, they sought to gain a monopoly in cloves as they had in nutmeg. However, "unlike nutmeg and mace, which were limited to the minute Bandas, clove trees grew all over the Moluccas, and the trade in cloves was beyond the limited policing powers of the corporation". Tourists are told that seedlings from this very tree were stolen by a Frenchman named Pierre Poivre in 1770, transferred to the Isle de France (Mauritius), and then later to Zanzibar, which was once the world's largest producer of cloves.

Current leaders in clove production are Indonesia, Madagascar, Tanzania, Sri Lanka, and Comoros. Indonesia is the largest clove producer, but only export a small portion of the cloves they produce, which amounts to around 10–15% of the country's clove production. They oftentimes have to import cloves from Madagascar to meet their needs.

Phytochemicals 

Eugenol comprises 72–90% of the essential oil extracted from cloves, and is the compound most responsible for clove aroma. Ultrasound-assisted and microwave-assisted extraction methods provide more rapid extraction rates with lower energy costs.

Other phytochemicals of clove oil include acetyl eugenol, beta-caryophyllene, vanillin, crategolic acid, tannins, such as bicornin, gallotannic acid, methyl salicylate, the flavonoids eugenin, kaempferol, rhamnetin, and eugenitin, triterpenoids such as oleanolic acid, stigmasterol, and campesterol and several sesquiterpenes. Although eugenol has not been classified for its potential toxicity, it was shown to be toxic to test organisms in concentrations of 50, 75, and 100 mg per liter.

Gallery

See also 

 Cinnamomum cassia
 Gallic acid
 Insect repellent
 Medicinal plant

References

External links 
 

aromaticum
Spices
Flora of the Maluku Islands
Plants used in Ayurveda
Plants used in traditional Chinese medicine
Non-timber forest products
Indian spices